"Fall in Love" is a song co-written and recorded by American country music singer Bailey Zimmerman. The song charted in June 2022, ahead of its release to radio and became Zimmerman's first number one on the Country Airplay chart, the first debut single to do so in 2022 and the fastest debut single to reach the top spot since 2015. It is lead single from his debut EP Leave the Light On and his upcoming debut studio album Religiously. The Album.

Content
Bailey Zimmerman wrote the song with Austin Shawn and Gavin Lucas. Jessica Nicholson of Billboard described the song as "lamenting" a lost love. Zimmerman came up with the song's idea in 2020, when he wrote the first verse and chorus before presenting them to Austin Shawn and Gavin Lucas at a songwriting session. Lucas thought the song had a style similar to Americana music.

Commercial performance
"Fall in Love" debuted at number 54 on Billboard Country Airplay and number 9 on the same publication's Hot Country Songs chart. These peaks preceded the song's release to country radio, which occurred on July 11. The song reached number one on the Country Airplay charts on December 5, 2022.

Charts

Weekly charts

Year-end charts

Certifications

Release history

References

2022 singles
Bailey Zimmerman songs
Warner Records Nashville singles